Rayko Stoynov (1 October 1937 – 17 March 2010) was a Bulgarian international football player. On club level Stoynov won one national championship with Botev Plovdiv in 1967 and one Bulgarian Cup (with the same team) in 1962.

Bulgarian footballers
1937 births
2010 deaths
Bulgaria international footballers
OFC Sliven 2000 players
Botev Plovdiv players
First Professional Football League (Bulgaria) players
Sportspeople from Pazardzhik

Association football defenders